The Type B ship is a United States Maritime Administration (MARAD) designation for World War II barges. Barges are very low cost to build, operate and move. Barges were needed to move large bulky cargo. A tug boat, some classed as Type V ships, could move a barge, then depart and move on to the next task. That meant the barge did not have to be rushed to be unloaded or loaded. Toward the end of World War 2, some ships that had not been completed in time for the war were converted to barges. US Navy barges are given the prefix: YWN or YW. Due to shortage of steel during World War II, concrete ship constructors were given contracts to build concrete barges, with ferrocement and given the prefix YO, YOG, YOGN. Built in 1944 and 1945, some were named after elements.

World War II barge types

Steel Barge 
 Built by Alabama Drydock and Shipbuilding Company in Mobile, AL, Type Coal,  Design # 1039
 USSB # 301 Name Darien Barge sold to Debardeleben Marine III, Texas in 1969
 USSB # 302 Name Mamai Barge sold renamed Patricia Sheridan in 1969
 Built by Union Bridge & Construction Company in Morgan City, LA, Design #1067
 USSB #2005    Barge
 USSB #2006    Barge
 USSB #2007    Barge
 Built by Nashville Bridge Company in Nashville, TN, Design # 1096
 USSB #2776    Barge, Tank
 USSB #2777    Barge, Tank
 USSB #2778    Barge, Tank
 USSB #2779    Barge, Tank

Freight Barges YF – YFN 
YFN barges were not self-propelled. YF barges were self-propelled. A YFN could carry a load of 550 long tons. YFN worked near shore and had a steel hull. They worked in harbors, rivers and other protected waters.  They were 110 feet long, had a 32-foot beam and maximum draft of 8 feet.
The Pacific Bridge Company built 27 YFN Freight Barges in 1943: YFN 576 to YFN 603. Pollock-Stockton Shipbuilding Company built: FN 619 to FN 742 YFN 998 to YFN 1016.

Refrigerated Freight Barges YFR – YFRN 
YFRN Barges were not self-propelled. YFR Barges were self-propelled. Olson & Winge of Seattle WA made 10 YFRN: YFRN-833 to YFRN-841 in 1943, for the war. Defoe Shipbuilding Company of Bay City, Michigan built three: YFR-888, YFR-889 and YFR-890 in 1945. Long Beach Naval Shipyard of Long Beach, California built the YFRN-997 in 1945. A few barges were converted to refrigerated barges, also called a reefer barge.

Repair Barges 

Yard Repair Berthing and Messing are repair Barges type TR, YR, YRB, YRBM, YRDH, YRDM, YRR, LBE were built for World War 2. Repair Barges were self sustaining, 530 tons and 153 feet long. Built in 1944, they had a beam of 36 feet and a draft of 6 feet. Repair Barges had a machine shop and living quarters. They repaired small boats and craft. The barge had generators, a distilling plant, an air compressor and steam boiler. The living space had berths, a mess hall to support a crew of 48 men.
 Floating Workshops are YR, 96 built, 24 built before ww2
 Repair and Berthing Barges are  YRB, 36 built
 Repair, Berthing and Messing Barges were YRBM, 56 built.  YRBM-18 (formerly APL-55) received the Presidential Unit Citation for service during the Vietnam War from 6 December 1968 to 31 March 1969.
 Dry-Dock Workshops – Hull are YRDH, 8 built
 Dry-Dock Workshops – Machinery are YRDM, 8 built
 Radiological Repair Barges are YRR, 14 built. Used to support nuclear plant overhauls of nuclear ships and submarines, also refueling and decontamination of used equipment.
 LBE Landing Barge, Emergency repair used in WW2 to repair landing craft.

Barracks Barge 
US Navy Barracks Barges, also called berthing barge was 1,300 tons and 261 feet long. They were used as a temporary barracks for sailors or other military personnel. A barracks ship also saw use as a receiving unit for sailors who needed temporary residence prior to being assigned to their ship. Barracks Barges are a type of auxiliary ship, called an APL for auxiliary personal living.
 APL-1 to 58 are Non-self-propelled Barracks Ships built in 1944 and 1945. APL displaced 2,600 tons at full load. Dimensions are 261.2 feet long, 49.2 feet beam, draft 8.5 feet when fully loaded. WW2 armament was four 20 mm guns. Crew quarters could accommodate 71 officers and 583 men. Some are still in use. Sample see USS Mercer (APL-39).
 APL-59 to APL-72 are post WW2 Barracks Ships.

Aircraft Barge – YCV 
YCV Barge were built to transport Aircraft, but by Alameda Works Shipyard and Pearl Harbor NSY at 480 tons.

Landing Barge, Kitchen 
Landing Barge, Kitchen or LBK, was a landing craft used to support amphibious landings in Northwestern Europe during and after the Normandy invasion of Second World War. Its primary purpose was to provide hot meals to the crews of the many minor landing craft not fitted with galley facilities. Constructed of steel, this shallow-draft lighter had storage and serving space to feed 900 men for one week. The kitchen capacity was able to provide 1,600 hot meals and 800 cold meals a day. They were used by both the US and British on D-Day.

Landing Barge, Vehicle 
Landing Barge, Vehicle (LBV 1, mark 1) was a barge with a ramp added to load and unload vehicles like: jeeps and trucks during World War 2. A nine-foot, four-inch ramp was added to the stern for loading and unloading. LBV 2, Mark 2, had an engine that could propel the LBV at 4.5 knots. They were powered by 2 Chrysler RM Gas engines and were used by both the US and British on D-Day. Built in three sizes: small (S) 70 feet long, medium (M) 78 feet long and large (L) 82 feet long. Each had a draft of about 4 feet when loaded.

Landing Barge, Oiler 
Landing Barge, Oiler (LBO) and YO and YON stored fuel oil or diesel fuel for landing craft. They had a 40-ton fuel tank, with two compartments and an engine that could propel them at 4.5 knots. They were used by both the US and British on D-Day.

Landing Barge, Water 
Landing Barge, Water (LBW or YW) a barge with a 33-ton fresh water tank and an engine that could propel them at 4.5 knots. They were World War 2 landing support vessels. Used by both the US and British on D-Day.  YWN are non-self propelled.

Landing Barge, Flak 
Landing Barge, Flak (LBF) a Landing Barge with a 40mm anti-aircraft gun, manned by a crew of five. Also had Two 20-mm Hispano AA guns or two twin Lewis guns. The LBF were 60 to 90 feet long. They could transport 15 troops. Used by both the US and British on D-Day.

Deck barge 

Deck barges offered a large flat platform, on which many types of gear could be moved. The only downside was the cargo had a slightly higher center of gravity. A number of shipyards built deck barges. Kyle and Company built of Stockton, California built US Army BC 522 to BC 535 deck barges in 1942, that had a length of 110 feet, a beam of 35 feet, a draft of 6 feet, light displacement of 170 tons, full displacement of 500 tons, and deadweight of 330 tons.

Concrete Barge 
 Built by Concrete Ship Constructors in National City, California in 1944 and 1945. These were a type of concrete ship built with ferrocement. Steel shortages led the US military to order the construction of small fleets of ocean-going concrete barge and ships. Typical Displacement: , full load: 12,910 tons. Length:,  beam: , draft: , crew 52 officers and men. Ship armament 1 to 4 40 mm AA gun Concrete Ships were fitted as needed. Some had diesel-electric power generators for refrigeration or tool use. Others were used to store fuel or water (up to 60,000 barrels). Some were used for water distilling. Others were the Quartermaster general store.
 Type MC B7-A2 tank barges made by Concrete Ship Constructors Inc in National City CA.
B7-A2 were 5,786 deadweight tons concrete barges.
 YOGN-42 Sunk by Japanese submarine I-39

 YOG-85
 YO-144
 YOG-40
 YOG-41 
 YOG-42  Beached off a Hawaiian island, visible from the shore
 YOG-64  Service history unknown, now wrecked at the Staten Island boat graveyard, currently known as the Donjon Iron and Metal Scrap Facility
 YO-145
 YO-146  Sank in accident July 1957
 YOG-53
 YO-159  Sunk by Japanese submarine RO-42 off New Hebrides 14 Jan 1944
 YO-160  Atomic bomb test at Bikini Atoll on 25 Jul 1946
 YO-161  Sank Eniwetok 29 Nov 1946
 YO-162
 YO-163
 YO-182
 YO-183
 YOGN-82  Sunk on June 23, 2018, to form an artificial reef in Powell River, B.C.
 YO-184  Sank at Eniwetok during typhoon Sep. of 1946
 YO-185  Sank off Saipan 16 March 1946.
 YOG-83  Sank off Kwajalein 16 Sep. 1948.
 YO-186  Sank at sea off Guam 5 April 1948.
 YO-187  Lost by grounding off Midway Island in 1957
 YOG-84 Lost during typhoon at sea off Saipan 14 Nov 1948

Type B5-BJ1 were covered dry cargo barges mostly operated by the Army. They were 265 feet long with a deadweight of 1,632 tons.

 Barium
 Helium
 Nitrogen
 Radium
 Argon
 Cadmium
 Chromium
 Cobalt
 Iridium
 Lithium
 Magnesium
 Neon
 Nickel
 Phosphorus
 Sodium
 Sulphur
 Tellurium
 Tungsten
 Uranium
 Bismuth
 Bromide
 Hydrogen with reefer storage
 Calcium  with reefer storage
 Antimony with reefer storage
 Cerium  maintenance barges
 Radon maintenance barges
 YOGN 104 built by Alabama Dry Dock  Mobile AL Ex-C 105, disposed of 1947
 1950s Built by Trinity Industries in Nashville TN, 165 feet long, 245 tons.
 YOGN-110
 YOGN-111
 YOGN-112
 YOGN-113
 Built by Albina Engine & Machine in Portland OR, 165 feet long, 245 tons.
 YOGN-114
 YOGN-115 used to support cooling efforts at the Fukushima Daiichi nuclear power 
 YOGN-116
 YOGN-117
 YOGN-118
 YOGN-119 renamed YON 367, sunk as target 1973
 YOGN-120 renamed Ex-BG 1165, sunk as target 1978
 YOGN-121
 YOGN-122 Ex-BG 8452, scrapped 1986
 YOGN-123 Ex-BG 6380, YON 252
 YOGN-124 Ex-BG 6383, struck 2006
 YOGN-125 Ex-YWN 154, now YON
 Built by Manitowoc SB in Manitowoc WI, 174 feet long, 440 tons.
 YOGN-196 renamed Ex-YO 196, sunk as target 2000

Trefoil-class concrete barge
Type: B7-D1 were built by Barrett & Hilp in South San Francisco, California. They had a tonnage of M.C. Deadweight: 5,687, Full Load: 10,970 tons.
Dimensions: Length: 366'4" by Beam: 54' with max. Draft: 26'

 
 
 
  (ex-)
 
 
 
 
 
 
 
 
 

B7-A1
B7-A1 were 5,786 deadweight tons concrete barges.
 MacEvoy Shipbuilding Corp. of Savannah, Georgia made seven B7-A1 concrete barges in 1944.
 San Jacinto Shipbuilding Corp. of Houston TX made four B7-A1 concrete barges in 1943.

C1-S-D1
C1-S-D1 were made by McCloskey & Company in Hookers Point, Tampa, Florida in 1944. McCloskey built 24 C1-S-D1. Many were sunk after the as war as breakwater barriers. B7-A1 were 5,004 deadweight tons concrete barges.
Name – Completed – Fate
  Vitruvius     Dec-43  Sunk as a breakwater at Normandy
  David O. Saylor    Nov-43  Sunk as a breakwater at Normandy
  Arthur Newell Talbot    Feb-44  Sunk as a breakwater at Kiptopeke VA
  Richard Lewis Humphrey    Mar-44  Sold in Mexico
  Richard Kidder Meade    Mar-44  Sunk as a breakwater at Kiptopeke VA
  Willis A. Slater    Feb-44  Sunk as a breakwater at Kiptopeke VA
  Leonard Chase Watson    Jun-44  Sunk as a breakwater at Kiptopeke VA
  John Smeaton      Apr-44  Afloat as a breakwater at Powell River BC
  Joseph Aspdin      May-44  Wrecked and lost 1948
  John Grant      Jun-44  Sunk as a breakwater at Kiptopeke VA
  M. H. Le Chatelier    1055  Jul-44  Afloat as a breakwater at Powell River BC
  L. J. Vicat      Jul-44  Afloat as a breakwater at Powell River BC
  Robert Whitman Lesley    1057  Jul-44  Sunk as a breakwater at Kiptopeke VA
  Edwin Thacher      Jul-44  Sunk as a breakwater at Kiptopeke VA
  C. W. Pasley      Aug-44  Sunk as a breakwater at Newport OR
 Armand Considere    Sep-44  Afloat as a breakwater at Powell River BC
  Francois Hennebique    Sep-44  Sunk as a breakwater at Newport OR
  P. M. Anderson      Sep-44  Afloat as a breakwater at Powell River BC
 Albert Kahn     Oct-44  Abandoned and lost 1947
  Willard A. Pollard    Nov-44  Sunk as a breakwater at Kiptopeke VA
  William Foster Cowham    Nov-44  Sunk as a breakwater at Kiptopeke VA
  Edwin Clarence Eckel    Dec-44  Scuttled 1946
  Thaddeus Merriman    Nov-44  Afloat as a breakwater at Powell River BC
  Emile N. Vidal      Dec-44  Afloat as a breakwater at Powell River BC

Wood Barge 

A number of different types of wood barges were used in the war. A flat bottom wood barge could be used in shallow ports or be towed onto beaches. They were low cost to build and could be abandoned after used if needed. To stop wooden hull rot many had copper-sheathed hulls. With the shortage of steel, a fleet of wood barges was built and a fleet of concrete barges were also built.
 YS-110 was a 80-foot wood barge with a 40-foot beam. She had a flat deck and was built in the Pearl Harbor Navy Yard in 1943.
 YS-88 was a 100-foot wood barge with a 42-foot beam. Built in the Pearl Harbor Navy Yard in 1941.
 YC-843 to YC-847 were built by Martha's Vineyard Ship Building Company in Vineyard Haven, MA, 110-foot wood barges for the US Navy at 250 tons in 1942
 Built by American Lumber in Millville, Florida
 Millville   EFC # 2432  USSB Design #1067
 Built by Beaumont Shipbuilding & Dry Dock Company in Beaumont, TX:
 Shelbank EFC #2127  later completed as sailing ship Marie F. Cummins, scrapped in 1947
 Shelby EFC #2128 later completed as sailing ship Albert D. Cummins, now rest in mud in the Delaware River.
 Built by Coastwise Shipbuilder in Baltimore, MD
 Catonsville EFC #2141
 Sherwood EFC #2142
 Carroll EFC #2143
 Built by Cobb & Company, F. in Rockland, ME
 Whitehead EFC #2481
 Built by Crook, H. E.  Baltimore MD
 Druid Hill EFC #2594
 Ruxton EFC #2595
 Built by Crosby Navigation in Richmond, VA
 Hallowell EFC #2577
 Richmond EFC #2578

YFNB 
YFNB Large Covered Lighter, non-self-propelled barge, such as US Navy YFNB_47, a 152 feet, 36 feet beam barge that was used for repair, e.g. YR 47 and YRR 9 .

YFNX 
YFNX were Special Purpose Barges, that were non-self-propelled and used at shore. Most were a modified YC or YFN hull. The modified barge gave the craft a specialized use, such as a laboratory, sonar research or stowage for submarine goods.

YFND 
YFND or Dry Dock Companion Craft, were non-self-propelled barges. YFND were a special purpose barge used to support the auxiliary floating drydocks, which had little crew support space.

YFP 
YFP were Floating Power Barges, a non-self-propelled barge with fuel and a generator to make a mobile power station, and were able to produce up to 20,000 kilowatts of power.

YOG – YOGN - YG
YOG were self propelled Gasoline Barges, with tanks for gasoline that had a capacity of 8,200 Bbls. YOGN were non-self-propelled Gasoline Barges.

YG 
YG were Garbage Barges, also called Lighter, and were self-propelled with one direct-drive Atlas diesel engine to a single propeller, 240 shp.

YGN 
YGN were Garbage Barges that were non-self-propelled.

YPD 
YPD were Floating Pile Drivers, and were non-self-propelled barges, used to built piers.

YSR 
YSR were Sludge Removal Barges, a non-self-propelled sludge removal barge 110 foot long with a 34-foot beam. Built for cleaning fuel oil or other tanks that have sludge and/or foreign matter.

US Army
The United States Army barges were given the prefix of "B".  For World War II over 6,000 barges were built for the Army, by 130 different shipyards. Often used for assault landings, if there was no harbor, a bulldozer or tank could tow the barge onto the beachhead, so supplies would be available to the Troops. Barges were also used for ship-to-ship transfers and as a way to unload ships quickly, then move by a tugboat, also called a Sea mule.
 Type B: Barge
 Type BC: Deck barge (Med. 110'-130') 
 Type BW: Water barge
 Type BD: Derrick crane barge  
 Type BSP: Self-propelled barge
 Type BG: Gasoline tank barge, or other liquid 
 Type BTL: Truck (Tank) Landing barge
 Type BCL: Dry cargo large barge  (Large - 210' or more)
 Type BCS: Dry cargo small barge  (Sm. 45' - 60')
 Type BB: Balloon barge, for Barrage balloons
 Type BBP: Balloon Barrage Leader, self-propelled barge
 Type BCLF: Causeway barge (lighter pier into water)
 Type BPL: Pier lighter
 Type BK: Knockdown barge, Deck barge modules that can be connected together
 Type BKC: Knockdown barge, Deck barge modules that can be connected together (Med. 110'-130')
 Type BKR: Refrigeration barge, Knockdown
 Type BKO: Tank barge knockdown
 Type BKSC: Nesting barge knockdown
 Type FMS: Repair Shop barge 
 Type JMLS: Joint Modular Lighter System
 Type BDL: Beach discharge lighter
 Type BCDK: Enclosed barge Knockdown

World War I barge types 
Many World War I barges were used in World War II, due to the high demand.

Steel 
 Built by American Steel Barge Company in Superior, WI, from 1891 to 1945.
 YW , YW-1 to YW-132, Water Barge self-propelled
 Water Barge non-self-propelled
 YWN-145 (was YW-145)
 YWN-146 (was YW-146)
 YWN-147
 YWN-148 ex YON-187
 YW-149
 YW-150
 YW-151
 YW-152
 YWN-153
 YWN-154
 YW-155
 *YWN-156 ex YOGN-116
 YWN-157 ex YOG-32

Wood 
 Built by Anacortes Shipways in Anacortes, WA in 1918 
 USSB Barden type# 1001, LDT 2,551,
 USSB Dacula type# 1001, LDT 2,551,
 USSB Western Larch I  type# B5-G1
 USSB Western Larch II type# B5-G1
 USSB Western Larch III type# B5-G1
 Built by Allen Shipbuilding in Seattle, WA in 1919, Design # 1115
 USSB Allenhurst type 1115
 USSB Ahmik type 1115
 Built by Coastwise Shipbuilding in Baltimore MD in 1919, design # 1067
 USSB  Sherwood
 USSB  Catonsville
 USSB Carroll
 Built by Crook, H. E. in Baltimore MD, design # 1067
 USSB Druid Hill (1919)
 USSB  Ruxton (1920)
 Built by Crosby Navigation in Richmond VA, design # 1067
 USSB Hallowell
 Built by Gildersleeve Shipbuilding in Gildersleeve, CT, Coal Barge, design#115
 USSB YC 600
 USSB YC 601
 USSB YC 602
 Built by Johnson Shipyards in Mariners Harbor, NY, 1919, design#1067
 USSB Tompkinsville
 Built by Machias Shipbuilding in Machias, ME, 1919, design#1067
 USSB  Wellesley
 USSB  Jonesport
 Built by McEachern Shipbuilding in Astoria, OR, 1920
 USSB Cabria
 Built by Meacham & Babcock in Seattle WA, 1919, design#1001
 USSB  Chalois
 USSB  Charnis
 Built by Midland Bridge in Houston, TX, 1919, design#1067
 USSB  Aransas
 USSB  Matagorda
 Built by Sloan Shipyards in Anacortes, WA, 1918, design#1001
 USSB Cabacan
 USSB  Dacula
Johns River Shipyard Co. in Jacksonville, FL, 1919, design#1067
 USSB  Anastasia
 USSB  Daytona
 USSB  Ormond
 Built by Tacoma Shipbuilding in Tacoma, WA, 1918, design#1001
 USSB  Dione
 Built by Wright Shipyards in Tacoma WA, 1918, design#1001
 USSB Endymeon

Concrete 

Concrete Barges were used in WW1. Louis L. Brown built concrete barges at Verplank, New York.
 YC-516 – Barge # 1 (Coal Barge #516), built 1918.
 YC-442 – Barge # 442 – Built 1918, displacement 922 tons.
 For WW1 12 emergency fleet concrete barges were ordered for the war, but they were not completed in time and were sold to private companies.
(12 Concrete ships were also built, like the SS Atlantus.)

Notable incidents 
 YOG 42, Gasoline barge. Under tow by Navajo – AT64, when Navajo was torpedoed and sunk by Japanese submarine I-39 on 12 September 1943, 150 miles East of Espiritu Santo. Recovered by USS Sioux (AT-75).
 YO-64 Sank due to enemy action in the Philippines in January 1942.
 YO 41 and YO 42 Fuel oil barges. Sank 22 Feb 1942 during enemy action in the Philippines.
 YSP- 44, YSP- 46, YSP- 47, YSP- 48, YSP- 49 Salvage barges and the YSR-2, a sludge barge, sank 22 Feb. 1942 during enemy action in the Philippines.
 YW-54 Water barge, destroyed in early 1942 in enemy action in the Philippines.
 YW-50, YW-55 and YW-58 water barges, captured 10 December 1941 with the surrender of American forces on Guam.
 YC-891 Sank on 18 April 1945, while under tow by the tug Mauvila (YT-328) off Key West, Florida.
 USS YOG-76 Sank on 13 November 1969 in Cua Viet Cove, South Vietnam after two underwater explosions hit her. Refloated and taken to Da Nang, South Vietnam. Not repaired due to severe damage.
 Syncline YO-63 A Bullwheel Class Fuel Oil Barge, Self-propelled, sank in 1972 north of Tahiti.
 YW-114 A YW-83 Class Self-propelled Water Barge. Sank when cargo shifted at Tongass Narrows near Ketchikan, Alaska on 12 August 1989.
 YF-1079 Ran aground and damaged at Buckner Bay, Okinawa, after Typhoon Louise in October 1945. YF-757 also sank in the storm.
 YON-184 Sank at Eniwetok in a typhoon in September 1946.
 Winifred Sheridan A sea-going coal barge. Sank with the Mary E. O’Hara a sailing fishing ship after they collided on  January 20, 1941, in blinding snowstorm off The Graves Light.
 Chickamauga While under tow by the steamer Samuel Mitchell, she collided with the Mitchell at Houghton Point, Lake Superior on May 18, 1908, in fog.
 Dunaj 2 Sank after striking a mine in the Sea of Azov on 29 Sep 1943.
 YC21 Sank in a storm on 15 November 1968.
 YCK-8 Wooden barge sank 2.7 miles off Key West, Florida on 12 December 1943. She was under tow by Army tug LT-4.
  A self-propelled fuel oil barge. Two torpedoes hit YO-159's concrete hull, causing the loss of her fuel oil cargo which caught fire.
  An S-class Trefoil concrete barge was wrecked at Saipan, Northern Mariana Islands in a storm on 6 October 1944.
 USS YO-156  and USS YO-157 World War II self-propelled fuel oil barges. Lost at Sitka, Alaska in May 1945.
  An S class Trefoil concrete barge. Ran aground on  9 October 1945 during a Typhoon Louise off Okinawa.
 YON-160 Sank in Operation Crossroads. The fuel oil barge was sunk as a target by an atomic bomb at Bikini Atoll on 25 July 1946.
 USS Lignite (IX-162) Wrecked by a typhoon, 9 October 1945.
 YC-442, Barge # 442 sank 11 September 1923.

United Kingdom 
 Thames lighters, or dumb barges, were non-self-propelled barges. The original Thames barges were sailing vessels, many were converted for the war. Some LB vessels had ramps added and were called LBR or Landing Barge, Ramped. Some had engines and rudder added and were referred to as LBV or Landing Barge Vehicle. They were used for different tasks: Landing Barge Oiler (LBO), Water (LBW), Kitchen (LBK) and Emergency Repair (LBE), Landing Barge Flak (LBF) and Gun (LBG). There was also one Landing Barge Cable (LBC). Many brought supplies to Normandy.

Current barge classes 
Type B I barge hull. Designed to ensure no uncontrolled release of cargo to the water or atmosphere.

Type B II barge hull. Designed to carry products which require substantial preventive measures to ensure no uncontrolled release of cargo to the water or atmosphere, but only if the release does not constitute a long term hazard.

Type B III barge hull. Designed to transport products classed as minor hazards, thus needing less degree of control.

See also 
 Barracks ship, barge
 Rhino ferry
 Ramped cargo lighter
 Marinefährprahm
 Operation Sea Lion
 United States Merchant Marine Academy
 List of auxiliaries of the United States Navy
 List of yard and district craft of the United States Navy

Other MARAD designs
 Liberty ship (Type EC2-S-C1 ship)
 Type C1 ship
 Type C2 ship
 Type C3 ship
 Type V ship
 Victory ships (Type VC2-S-AP1 ship)

References

External links 

 History of ferro-concrete ships
 Comprehensive list of ferro-concrete builders
 Images of concrete vessels from the National Monuments Record Photographic record of the construction and launch of the Cretemanor at Preston and the Seacraft Concrete Co on the Mersey.
 "Pour in the Concrete and Take Out a Ship", February 1919 Popular Science
  "How Pour Ships Are Made" , June 1943, Popular Science

Ship types
World War II merchant ships of the United States